Truman is a city in Martin County, Minnesota, United States. The population was 1,115 at the 2010 census. In 2018, the U.S. Census Bureau estimated the population to be 1,053.

History
Truman was platted in 1899. It was named for Truman Clark, the son of a railroad official. A post office has been in operation in Truman since 1899.

Geography

Minnesota State Highway 15 serves as a main route in the city.

Demographics

2010 census
As of the census of 2010, there were 1,115 people, 479 households, and 298 families living in the city. The racial makeup of the city was 97.6% White, 0.2% African American, 0.2% Native American, 0.6% Asian, 0.4% from other races, and 1.0% from two or more races. Hispanic or Latino of any race were 2.4% of the population.

There were 479 households, of which 29.4% had children under the age of 18 living with them, 48.9% were married couples living together, 9.2% had a female householder with no husband present, 4.2% had a male householder with no wife present, and 37.8% were non-families. 32.6% of all households were made up of individuals, and 18.2% had someone living alone who was 65 years of age or older. The average household size was 2.23 and the average family size was 2.79.

The median age in the city was 47.4 years. 23.5% of residents were under the age of 18; 5% were between the ages of 18 and 24; 19.3% were from 25 to 44; 26.8% were from 45 to 64; and 25.5% were 65 years of age or older. The gender makeup of the city was 48.6% male and 51.4% female.

2000 census
As of the census of 2000, there were 1,259 people, 510 households, and 318 families living in the city. The racial makeup of the city was 99.21% White, 0.16% African American, 0.32% Native American, 0.08% Asian, and 0.24% from two or more races. Hispanic or Latino of any race were 0.56% of the population.

There were 510 households, out of which 26.3% had children under the age of 18 living with them, 52.5% were married couples living together, 7.6% had a female householder with no husband present, and 37.6% were non-families. 33.3% of all households were made up of individuals, and 20.0% had someone living alone who was 65 years of age or older. The average household size was 2.25 and the average family size was 2.90.

In the city, the population was spread out, with 22.9% under the age of 18, 5.2% from 18 to 24, 22.8% from 25 to 44, 21.1% from 45 to 64, and 28.0% who were 65 years of age or older. The median age was 44 years. For every 100 females, there were 86.2 males. For every 100 females age 18 and over, there were 75.6 males.

The median income for a household in the city was $35,000, and the median income for a family was $46,750. Males had a median income of $31,292 versus $20,850 for females. The per capita income for the city was $18,305. About 5.6% of families and 9.2% of the population were below the poverty line, including 13.5% of those under age 18 and 10.2% of those age 65 or over.

Notable people
William A. Hinton, Minnesota state senator, lived in Truman.
Peter John Eli Peterson, Minnesota state representative, businessman, and farmer, lived in Truman.

References

External links
Truman, Minnesota -- Official site

Cities in Martin County, Minnesota
Cities in Minnesota